Fi-Fi Goes to Heaven is an album by American pianist Joanne Brackeen recorded in 1986 and released on the Concord Jazz label.

Reception 

AllMusic reviewer Scott Yanow stated "this very well-rounded outing finds the adventurous pianist Joanne Brackeen splitting the program between four originals and three veteran tunes (including "Stardust"). In addition to bassist Cecil McBee and drummer Al Foster, the CD is quite special, for it matches Brackeen with trumpeter Terence Blanchard and Branford Marsalis (whom she insisted play mostly on his earlier specialty, alto). The young lions work well with Brackeen and her rhythm mates on this consistently stimulating and occasionally playful set. A perfect introduction to Joanne Brackeen's music". The album was selected as one of the 1001 Best Jazz albums for The Penguin Jazz Guide with the authors stating "Brackeen is a superb group player and in Cecil McBee has found a bass-player who perfectly complements her right-biased approach to the keyboard ... The set is also distinguished by Branford Marsalis' appearance on alto, his first instrument but one that has played next to no part in his career. He's very convincing on it, though initially hard to place".

Track listing 
All compositions by Joanne Brackeen except where noted.
 "Estilo Magnifico" – 6:17
 "Stardust" (Hoagy Carmichael, Mitchell Parish) – 7:56
 "Fi-Fi Goes to Heaven" – 5:28
 "Zingaro" (Antônio Carlos Jobim) – 6:52
 "I Hear a Rhapsody" (George Fragos, Jack Baker, Dick Gasparre) – 5:58
 "Cosmonaut" – 3:03
 "Dr. Chang" – 5:28

Personnel 
Joanne Brackeen – piano
Terence Blanchard – trumpet
Branford Marsalis – alto saxophone, soprano saxophone
Cecil McBee – bass
Al Foster – drums

References 

Joanne Brackeen albums
1987 albums
Concord Records albums
Instrumental albums